ADA or AdA may refer to:

Organizations
 Amazon Development Agency, a development agency in Brazil
 American Decency Association, an advocacy group against pornography
 American Dental Association
 American Diabetes Association
 American Dietetic Association, the former name of the Academy of Nutrition and Dietetics
 Americans for Democratic Action, a liberal advocacy organization
 Amigos dos Amigos, a drug cartel in Rio de Janeiro
 Association of Drainage Authorities, a membership body for those involved in water level management in the UK
 Australian Digital Alliance, a copyright advocacy group
 Australian Dental Association
 Austrian Development Agency, a development aid agency

Businesses
 Aerolínea de Antioquia, a Colombian Airline
 Alternative Distribution Alliance, a music distributor owned by Warner Music Group

Military
 Aeronautical Development Agency, an agency of India's Ministry of Defence
 Air Defense Artillery Branch, a branch of the U.S. Army specializing in anti-aircraft weapons
 Angehöriger der Armee (AdA), a person on active duty in the Swiss Armed Forces
 Armée de l'Air, the French Air Force

Science and technology
ADA, a cryptocurrency 
 ADA collider, an electron–positron collider
 Ada (programming language), a high-level computer programming language
 Adenosine deaminase, an enzyme involved in purine metabolism
 Advanced Distribution Automation, an extension of intelligent control over an electrical power grid
 Analog-to-digital converter (ADA or A/DA), an electronic converter in some electronic devices, often musical
 Apple Design Awards, an event at the Apple Worldwide Developers Conference
 Azodicarbonamide, a food additive also used in plastics production
 ADA (buffer), a chemical buffer in the physiological range

Law
 Airline Deregulation Act, a 1978 US law removing governmental control from commercial aviation
 Americans with Disabilities Act of 1990, a U.S. law that prohibits discrimination on the basis of disability
 Antideficiency Act, a U.S. law that prohibits the federal government from incurring debts not authorized by Congress
 Assistant District Attorney, a US government attorney position

Other uses
 Adana Şakirpaşa Airport (IATA code)
 After the Development of Agriculture (A.D.A.), a system of counting years
 Dangme language (ISO 639-2 and ISO 639-3 codes)
 Asociación Deportiva Agropecuaria, a football club based in the city of Jaén, Cajamarca, Perú

See also
 Ada (disambiguation)